This Is Not A Chicosci Record is the sixth studio album of the band Chicosci released in 2012 by MCA Music in the Philippines.

Track list

Reference

2012 albums
Chicosci albums